Kota Sakurai (born May 26, 1999) is a Japanese professional footballer.

College career
Sakurai enrolled at Dartmouth College in 2017. In his freshman year, he won the Ivy League Title with the team. He scored his first goal on October 13, 2018 against the Penn Quakers. In 2020, the season was postponed due to the COVID-19 pandemic, so Sakurai trained with a team in his native Japan four times per week. During his time with the Big Green from 2017 to 2019, he scored two goals and added six assists in 47 appearances.

Club career 
He joined the Toronto FC Academy in October 2015. He regularly featured for Toronto FC III during their League1 Ontario and Premier Development League campaigns from 2016 to 2018. He scored his first goal on May 15, 2016 against Windsor TFC. He was named the League1 Ontario Young Player of the Year in 2016, as well as a league Second Team All-Star.

With a number of Toronto FC II players unavailable for upcoming fixtures, Sakurai was called up to the squad in June 2016. He made his professional debut on July 2, 2016, appearing for 14 minutes in a 3-0 defeat to Wilmington Hammerheads in the USL. In doing so, he became the first ever Japanese player to feature competitively Toronto FC II.

In 2022, he signed a professional contract with Toronto FC II in MLS Next Pro.

References 

1998 births
Living people
Japanese footballers
Toronto FC players
Toronto FC II players
Association football midfielders
USL Championship players
People from Markham, Ontario
Japanese expatriate footballers
Expatriate soccer players in Canada
Dartmouth Big Green men's soccer players
MLS Next Pro players